The 2020 Tulsa Golden Hurricane football team represented the University of Tulsa in the 2020 NCAA Division I FBS football season. The Golden Hurricane played their home games at Skelly Field at H. A. Chapman Stadium in Tulsa, Oklahoma, and competed in the American Athletic Conference. They were led by sixth-year head coach Philip Montgomery.

Previous season

The Golden Hurricane finished the 2019 season 4–8, 2–6 in AAC play to finish in a tie for fifth place in the West Division.

Schedule
The Golden Hurricane had games scheduled against Toledo, Northwestern State, Arkansas State, and Houston, which were canceled due to the COVID-19 pandemic.  The game between Tulsa and Cincinnati was originally scheduled to take place on October 17, however, due to COVID-19 management requirements in response to positive tests and subsequent quarantine of individuals within the Cincinnati program, the game was rescheduled for December 5. On December 8, 2020 – The American Athletic Conference has announced that the regular-season football game between Cincinnati and Tulsa, scheduled for Saturday, Dec. 12, will not be played due to positive COVID-19 cases at Cincinnati. The regular-season game will not be rescheduled. Cincinnati and Tulsa are scheduled to meet Saturday, Dec. 19, in the American Athletic Conference Championship Game. In the absence of a regular-season head-to-head result to break the tie, the site of the championship game will be the home stadium of the team that is ranked higher in the Dec. 8 College Football Playoff rankings

Game summaries

at Oklahoma State

at UCF

at South Florida

East Carolina

SMU

Tulane

at Navy

at Cincinnati (AAC Championship Game)

Roster

Players drafted into the NFL

Media
99.5 Big Country is the Official Flagship Station of the University of Tulsa Golden Hurricane football team.

Radio affiliates
KXBL – 99.5 FM | Tulsa
KRIG – 104.9 FM | Bartlesville
KWON – 1400 AM | Bartlesville!
KCRC – 1390 AM | Enid
KTMC – 1400 AM/96.7 FM | McAlester
KOKL – 1240 AM | Okmulgee

! Coaches show

References

Tulsa
Tulsa Golden Hurricane football seasons
Tulsa Golden Hurricane football